The 4th Edward Jancarz Memorial was the 1996 version of the Edward Jancarz Memorial. It took place on 12 May in the Stal Gorzów Stadium in Gorzów Wielkopolski, Poland. The Memorial was won by Leigh Adams who beat Tony Rickardsson and Marek Hućko.

Heat details 
 12 May 1996 (Friday)
 Best Time: 64.35 - Marek Hućko in Heat 1
 Attendance: ?
 Referee: Roman Siwiak

Heat after heat 
 (64.35) Hućko, Rickardsson, Baron, J. Gollob (Fx)
 (65.52) Kasper, Lyons, Saitgariejew, Świst (R2)
 (65.44) Adams, Lemon, Moskwiak, Franczyszyn
 (66.77) T. Gollob, Bajerski, Staszewski, Boessner
 (65.23) Świst, Hućko, Staszewski, Lemon
 (64.47) Kasper, T. Gollob, J. Gollob, Franczyszyn
 (65.14) Adams, Baron, Saitgariejew, Bajerski
 (66.35) Rickardsson, Moskwiak, Lyons, Boessner
 (64.71) Hućko, Adams, Kasper, Boessner
 (65.42) Świst, Bajerski, J. Gollob, Moskwiak
 (66.36) Lyons, T. Gollob, Baron, Lemon
 (66.03) Staszewski, Saitgariejew, Rickardsson, Franczyszyn
 (66.31) T. Gollob, Saitgariejew, Hućko, Moskwiak
 (66.79) Adams, J. Gollob, Lyons, Staszewski (F4)
 (66.98) Świst, Boessner, Paluch, Baron, Franczyszyn (-)
 (65.70) Rickardsson, Bajerski, Lemon, Kasper (Fx)
 (66.43) Bajerski, Hućko, Lyons, Flis, Franczyszyn (-)
 (67.34) J. Gollob, Saitgariejew, Lemon, Boessner (R4)
 (66.69) Kasper, Moskwiak, Baron, Staszewski
 (65.45) Rickardsson, Adams, Świst, T. Gollob

See also 
 motorcycle speedway
 1996 in sports

References

External links 
 (Polish) Stal Gorzów Wlkp. official webside

Memorial
Edward Jancarz
1996